AQUAL is a theory of gravity based on Modified Newtonian Dynamics (MOND), but using a Lagrangian. It was developed by Jacob Bekenstein and Mordehai Milgrom in their 1984 paper, "Does the missing mass problem signal the breakdown of Newtonian gravity?". "AQUAL" stands for "A QUAdratic Lagrangian".

The gravitational force law obtained from MOND, 

has a serious defect: it violates Newton's third law of motion, and therefore fails to conserve momentum and energy.

but the third law gives  so we would get 

 

even though  and  would therefore be constant, contrary to the MOND assumption that it is linear for small arguments.

This problem can be rectified by deriving the force law from a Lagrangian, at the cost of possibly modifying the general form of the force law. Then conservation laws could then be derived from the Lagrangian by the usual means.

The AQUAL Lagrangian is: 

this leads to a modified Poisson equation: 

where the predicted acceleration is  These equations reduce to the MOND equations in the spherically symmetric case, although they differ somewhat in the disc case needed for modelling spiral or lenticular galaxies. However, the difference is only 10–15%, so does not seriously impact the results.

According to Sanders and McGaugh, one problem with AQUAL (or any scalar–tensor theory in which the scalar field enters as a conformal factor multiplying Einstein's metric) is AQUAL's failure to predict the amount of gravitational lensing actually observed in rich clusters of galaxies.

References

Astrophysics
Theories of gravity
Lagrangian mechanics